The 14th Fighter Squadron is part of the 35th Fighter Wing at Misawa Air Base, Japan. It operates the F-16 Fighting Falcon aircraft conducting Wild Weasel missions.  The squadron has been stationed at Misawa since 1987.

The squadron was first activated during World War II as the 14th Photographic Reconnaissance Squadron.  After training in the United States, the squadron moved to the European Theater of Operations. where it flew combat reconnaissance missions.  It earned a Distinguished Unit Citation for missions flown over France between 31 May 1944 and the end of June.  The squadron flew sorties to support Operation Overlord, the invasion of Normandy and Operation Market Garden, the airborne attack in the Netherlands.  It conducted bomb damage assessment of Germany after VE Day.  The squadron returned to the United States and was inactivated at the port of embarkation in December 1945.

The squadron served in the reserves as a reconnaissance unit from November 1947 to June 1947 at Binghamton, New York, and as a troop carrier unit at Mitchel Air Force Base, New York, from 1952 until it was replaced in 1953 by a squadron that had been called to active duty for the Korean War.

The squadron returned to the reconnaissance mission in April 1967 and after training in Texas moved to Udorn Royal Thai Air Force Base and flew combat missions in Southeast Asia from November 1967 until August 1973, earning two Presidential Unit Citations.  For a period in 1971, it was the only reconnaissance squadron in Southeast Asia.  The squadron was inactivated in June 1975 with the United States withdrawal from Southeast Asia.

Mission
The squadron operates General Dynamics F-16CJ Wild Weasel aircraft. It conducts Suppression of Enemy Air Defenses air operations.

History

World War II

The squadron was first activated at Colorado Springs, Colorado in June 1942 as the 14th Photographic Reconnaissance Squadron, although it was more than a month before it moved to nearby Peterson Field and began training with Lockheed F-4 Lightnings under the 3d Photographic Group. In August 1942, the 3d Group moved to England.  The squadron remained assigned to the 3d, but remained in Colorado, where it was attached to Second Air Force. In July 1943, the squadron was assigned to the 7th Photographic Reconnaissance and Mapping Group and moved on paper with the 7th Group to England.  The 7th Group drew on the 13th Photographic Squadron, which was already flying Lightnings in England for its cadre. The 14th Squadron began to train with Supermarine Spitfire Mk. V fighters in July 1943 before equipping with the photographic reconnaissance Mk. XI version of the Spitfire in late summer.

The 14th flew combat reconnaissance missions in the European Theater of Operations from 12 August 1943 until 25 April 1945.  The squadron's Spitfires flew the majority of the target photography missions (including the first Spitfire reconnaissance mission over Berlin in March 1944), while the other squadrons of the 7th, equipped with Lightnings, concentrated on photographic mapping.  Squadron deep penetration missions included reconnaissance of oil refineries to determine when repairs had been performed that could justify returning them to Eighth Air Force's target list. It earned a Distinguished Unit Citation for reconnaissance missions flown over France between 31 May 1944 and the end of June.  The squadron flew over 300 successful sorties to support Operation Overlord, the invasion of Normandy. It flew missions over the Netherlands to support Operation Market Garden in October 1944 and conducted damage assessment of Germany until 23 July 1945. In late 1944, the squadron's unarmed aircraft, flying by themselves, began to prove vulnerable to the jet powered Messerschmitt Me 262s entering service with the Luftwaffe.  A squadron aircraft lost on 5 September 1944 was probably the first Army Air Forces loss to a German jet fighter. The unit turned its aircraft in to depots during the late summer and early fall of 1945. Squadron personnel returned to the United States and the unit was inactivated at the port of embarkation in December 1945

Air Force Reserves
The squadron was activated in November 1947 at Binghamton, New York as a reserve reconnaissance unit and assigned to the 65th Reconnaissance Group, which was located at nearby Rome Army Air Field. The squadron did not possess any tactical aircraft, but was assigned North American T-6 Texans and Beechcraft AT-11 Kansans for proficiency flying. Binghamton's airport had not been completed at this time, so it seems probable that the aircraft operated from Tri-Cities Airport in nearby Endicott.
President Truman’s reduced 1949 defense budget required reductions in the number of units in the Air Force, and the 14th was inactivated and not replaced as reserve flying operations at Binghamton ceased.

In June 1952, the squadron was redesignated the 14th Troop Carrier Squadron and again activated as part of the 65th Troop Carrier Wing, which replaced the 914th Reserve Training Wing at Mitchel Air Force Base, New York.  The squadron began to train with the Curtiss C-46 Commando with the assistance of the regular Air Force 2233d Air Force Reserve Flying Training Center. On 1 April 1953, the 514th Troop Carrier Wing, which had been mobilized for the Korean War, was returned to the reserves and replaced the 65th Wing. As part of this reorganization, the 14th Troop Carrier Squadron was inactivated in April 1953 and its personnel, equipment and mission was assumed by the 337th Troop Carrier Squadron, which was simultaneously transferred to the reserves at Mitchel.

Vietnam War

The squadron returned to the reconnaissance mission when it was organized at Bergstrom Air Force Base, Texas in April 1967 as the 14th Tactical Reconnaissance Squadron.  After equipping with the McDonnell RF-4 Phantom II, the squadron trained in reconnaissance with the 75th Tactical Reconnaissance Wing until October.

The squadron took three days to move to Udorn Royal Thai Air Force Base and flew its first combat missions in Southeast Asia on 2 November 1967.  The Phantoms of the squadron replaced the McDonnell RF-101 Voodoos of the 20th Tactical Reconnaissance Squadron, which was inactivated on 1 November 1967. It continued to fly combat until August 1973.  For a period in 1971, it was the only reconnaissance squadron in Southeast Asia.  It documented by aerial photography the communist takeover of Cambodia and the Republic of Vietnam in 1975.

Fighter operations in Japan

The squadron was again activated in 1987 as the 14th Tactical Fighter Squadron at Misawa Air Base, Japan. It initially trained for close air support using conventional weapons.  It also provided for the air defense of northern Japan.  The squadron has provided personnel and aircraft to support operations in Iraq and Afghanistan.

Lineage
 Constituted as the 14th Photographic Reconnaissance Squadron on 9 June 1942
 Activated on 20 June 1942
 Redesignated 14th Photographic Squadron (Light) on 5 February 1943
 Redesignated 14th Photographic Reconnaissance Squadron on 13 November 1943
 Inactivated on 27 December 1945
 Redesignated 14th Reconnaissance Squadron, Photographic on 8 October 1947
 Activated on 6 November 1947
 Inactivated on 27 June 1949
 Redesignated 14th Troop Carrier Squadron, Medium on 26 May 1952
 Activated on 14 June 1952
 Inactivated on 1 April 1953
 Redesignated 14th Tactical Reconnaissance Squadron and activated on 25 October 1966
 Organized on 3 April 1967
 Inactivated on 30 June 1975
 Redesignated 14th Tactical Fighter Squadron on 5 June 1984
 Activated on 1 January 1987
 Redesignated 14th Fighter Squadron on 31 May 1991

Assignments
 3d Photographic Group (later 3d Reconnaissance and Mapping Group): 20 June 1942 (attached to Second Air Force 31 August 1942, Army Air Forces 6 October 1942, Eighth Air Force after 5 May 1943)
 7th Photographic Reconnaissance and Mapping Group (later 7th Photographic Group, 7th Reconnaissance Group): 7 July 1943
 United States Air Forces in Europe: 21 November 1945 – 27 December 1945
 65th Reconnaissance Group: 6 November 1947 – 27 June 1949
 65th Troop Carrier Group: 14 June 1952 – 1 April 1953
 Tactical Air Command: 25 October 1966 (not organized)
 75th Tactical Reconnaissance Wing: 3 April 1967
 432d Tactical Reconnaissance Wing (later 432d Tactical Fighter Wing): 28 October 1967 – 30 June 1975
 432d Tactical Fighter Wing: 1 January 1987
 432d Operations Group, 31 May 1991
 35th Operations Group: 1 October 1994 – present

Stations
 Colorado Springs, Colorado, 20 June 1942
 Army Air Base, Colorado Springs (later Peterson Field), Colorado, 1 August 1942 – 24 April 1943
 RAF Mount Farm (Station 234), England, 12 May 1943
 RAF Chalgrove (Station 465), England, 2 April 1945
 Villacoublay Airfield (Station 180, A-42), France, c. 13 October – 12 December 1945
 Camp Shanks, New York, 24–27 December 1945
 Binghamton, New York, 6 November 1947 – 27 June 1949
 Mitchel Air Force Base, New York, 14 June 1952 – 1 April 1953
 Bergstrom Air Force Base, Texas, 3 April – 25 October 1967
 Udorn Royal Thai Air Force Base, Thailand, 28 October 1967 – 30 June 1975
 Misawa Air Base, Japan, 1 January 1987 – present

Aircraft

 Lockheed F-4 Lightning (1942)
 Lockheed F-5 Lightning (1942–1944, 1944–1945)
 Supermarine Spitfire Mk. V (1943)
 Supermarine Spitfire Mk. XI (1943–1945)
 North American P-51 Mustang (1945)
 Noorduyn C-64 Norseman (1945)
 Douglas C-53 Skytrooper (1945)
 North American T-6 Texan (1947–1949)
 Beechcraft AT-11 Kansan (1947–1949)
 Curtiss C-46 Commando (1952–1953)
 McDonnell RF-4 Phantom II (1967–1975)
 General Dynamics F-16 Fighting Falcon (1987 – present)

Awards and campaigns
 Decorations

 Campaigns

References

Notes
 Explanatory notes

 Citations

Bibliography
 
 
 
 
 
 
 
14th Fighter Squadron Fact Sheet

External links
 Spitfire 944: a short documentary (Honorable mention for short filmmaking Sundance Film Festival 2007.  The film focuses on World War II footage taken by the squadron's Flight Surgeon during World War II, and an interview with a squadron pilot filmed making a gear up landing following a mission to Berlin.)

014
1942 establishments in Colorado